Mecodema chaiup is a large-bodied ground beetle species found in Mohi Bush Scenic Reserve, Hawke's Bay, New Zealand. A single specimen was found beneath a large log in 2008 by D.S. Seldon and C.P. Martin (who it is named after). Since then a number of intensive pitfall trap surveys of Mohi Bush have failed to collect further specimens.

Diagnosis 
Mecodema chaiup is distinguished from other North Island Mecodema by:

 Narrow elytra (narrower than the pronotum at the widest point)
 Distinct asetose punctures in a confused pattern that are irregular in size and shape

Description 
Length 31 mm, pronotal width 8.5 mm, elytral width 6.5 mm. Colour of entire body matte black, except for the femur and tibiae which are dark reddish-brown.

Natural History 
Flightless and presumably a nocturnal predator of a range of ground invertebrates (e.g., spiders, carabids, worms), as are the other members of the genus.

References

chaiup
Beetles of New Zealand
Beetles described in 2015